E. Antonio Romero  (1925–2005) was a Guatemalan philosopher, historian, and writer.

References

This article was initially translated from the Spanish Wikipedia.

20th-century Guatemalan philosophers
20th-century Guatemalan historians
Guatemalan male writers
1925 births
2005 deaths
20th-century male writers